Johannes Bünderlin (b. Linz before 1500 – after 1540) was an Austrian Anabaptist. Bünderlin was a humanist Catholic priest who had been attracted to the Reformation in Moravia and was baptised by Johannes Denck. Bünderlin returned to Linz and preached there until forced to leave for Konstanz in 1529 at the invitation of Johannes Zwick, though Zwick soon considered that Bünderlin was too radical in his ideas and Bünderlin set out for Prussia.

Life
Johannes Bünderlin was born in Linz, Upper Austria and studied at the University of Vienna from 1515–1519 where he learned Hebrew, Greek and Latin, but left without taking a degree as he was unable to afford the tuition. He became a Lutheran preacher in the employ of an Austrian nobleman, but in 1526 received adult baptism as an Anabaptist in Augsburg, where he probably met Hans Denck. From Augsburg Bünderlin went first to Nikolsburg where Anabaptist leader Balthasar Hubmaier was arrested and later tortured and burned as a heretic. After two years, the continued persecution of Anabaptists prompted a move to the more free-thinking city of Strasbourg. Bünderlin was expelled from the city of Constance in 1530 because of his religious views.

Belief
Bünderlin believed in a two-fold revelation of God, as the living Word in the soul of man, and through external signs and events. He believed that through love, one could realize the inward Word, bring the human will to peace and harmony with God's will and become one with the eternal Spirit. The purpose of religion was to awaken the mind and to direct it to the inward Word.

This union with the Spirit, of living upward toward the divine goodness instead of downward toward individual selfhood is an act of free will that results in Salvation.

Published works

References

Austrian Anabaptists
16th-century Anabaptist ministers
16th-century Austrian people
16th-century Austrian writers
16th-century Christian mystics
Anabaptist theologians
Clergy from Linz
Protestant mystics
Year of birth uncertain